Sisco Mesa is an ice-capped mesa with steep rock walls whose summit area is 2 nautical miles (3.7 km) long and wide and rises to 3,350 m. It stands just north of Haworth Mesa between the heads of Norfolk and Olentangy Glaciers in the Wisconsin Range. Mapped by United States Geological Survey (USGS) from surveys and U.S. Navy air photos, 1960–64. Named by Advisory Committee on Antarctic Names (US-ACAN) for Joseph J. Sisco, Assistant Secretary of State for International Organization Affairs, Chairman of the Antarctic Policy Group in 1966.

Mesas of Antarctica
Landforms of Marie Byrd Land